The 2013–14 Mascom Top 8 Cup, also known as Mascom Top 8 Cup Season 3 for sponsorship reasons, was the third edition of the Mascom Top 8 Cup. It was played from November 2, 2013 to March 1, 2014 and featured the top eight teams from the 2012-13 Botswana Premier League. BDF XI defeated Township Rollers in the final to win their first title.

History
The 2013 tournament was played from November to March instead of February to May like the previous tournament. It was also the first tournament to span two calendar years. It was the only tournament to take place in Botswana for the season, since the 2014 FA Challenge Cup was not played, therefore the winner represented the country in the CAF Confederation Cup. There were no debutants in this edition of the Mascom Top 8 Cup.

Prize money
The prize money was kept the same from the 2013 competition.
 Champions: P1 000 000
 Runners up: P400 000
 Semifinalists: P200 000
 Quarterfinalists: P125 000

Format
The quarterfinals and semifinals were played over two legs both home and away, with only one final in a predetermined venue. Three points were awarded for a win, one point for a draw and none for a loss. Aggregate score was used to determine the winner of a round. Where the aggregate score was equal away goals were used to pick out the victor and if those were equal the tied teams went into a penalty shootout. There was no quarterfinal draw. The teams were seeded based on their position in the table, with the first placed team facing off against the eighth placed team.

Quarterfinals

Semifinals

Final

Awards
 Top goalscorer |  Jerome Louis (4 goals) | Township Rollers
 Player of the tournament |  Kabelo Seakanyeng | BDF XI
 Goalkeeper of the tournament |  Mwampule Masule | Township Rollers
 Coach of the tournament |  Madinda Ndlovu | Township Rollers
 Referee of the tournament |  Keabetswe Dintwa
 Assistant referee of the tournament |  Moletlanyi Keoagile
 Best electronic journalist (radio) |  Monnakgotla Mojaki | Gabz FM
 Best electronic journalist (TV) |  Aaron Radira | BTV
 Best radio commentator |  Fundi Gaoforwe | RB2
 Best TV commentator |  Nelson Ditibane | BTV
 Best print journalist |  Isaac Pheko | Botswana Guardian
 Best photographer |  Oaitse Sejakgomo | Sunday Standard

References

Botswana Premier League